, more commonly known simply as , is a fictional character in the Final Fight and Street Fighter video game series by Capcom. She has originally appeared in 1993 beat 'em up game Final Fight 2 as a younger sister of Guy's fiancée and one of the game's protagonist characters. Like Guy, Maki is trained in the Bushin style of ninjutsu and uses many of the same abilities and techniques.

In her original Japanese backstory, Maki is a fierce ex-leader of a youth motorcycle gang, but this was censored in the English version of the game. She was mostly well-received by critics and fans alike. Until Lucia from Final Fight 3 made a playable appearance in Street Fighter V, Maki was the only original character from the SNES Final Fight games to make comeback appearances in the later titles in and outside the series, notably in the fighting game Capcom vs. SNK 2.

Character
As she has been originally introduced, Maki is a short-tempered tomboy practitioner of the Bushin-Ryū fighting style, taught by her father Genryusai, the current leader of the Bushin ninja clan. She is a 20-year-old former leader of a bōsōzoku motorcycle gang, who loves to get into street fights and hates to be treated like a woman. English localizations of the game modified this in the manual, describing Maki as a peaceful girl who hates fighting. She has a feminine older sister named  (due to the Japanese confusion between "l" and "r", her name was originally transliterated as "Lena"), who is a fiancée of Guy from the first Final Fight.

Design 
Maki's look was inspired in part by in Diane Lane in the film Streets of Fire. She is young, well endowed woman usually clad in a red female ninja garb (her alternate palette in Final Fight 2 changes her outfit color from red to blue), but designed more in mind for function than flair, showing only her neck and some of her cleavage; beneath she wears a semi-transparent vest<ref>As shown in Final Fight 2'''s introduction when she phone calls Mike Haggar.</ref> and sports arm and leg guards with small boots. Her height is 162 cm and she weights 53 kg. Maki's blonde hair (her sister Rena is black-haired) tends to be long and held back in a ponytail, her bangs lighter colored than the rest. A promotional artwork published in Club Capcom magazine shows Maki in casual attire in front of her motorcycle, wearing a black leather halter top that buttons up near her neck, black biker-style gloves, yellow baggy pants fastened by a black rope, and a long pink bandana; her hair appears to be crimped and is untied and darker (retaining the brighter highlights for her bangs). GameSpy's Hardcore Gaming 101 called Maki from Final Fight 2 a "sexy Mai Shiranui ripoff" and GameSpot noted "the sexy female ninja Maki [has] more than a passing resemblance to SNK's Mai Shiranui but swings a tonfa instead of a fan." Comparisons to Mai have been made by other sources, including CNET and IGN,Smith, David. (2001-11-02). Capcom vs. SNK: Mark of the Millennium 2001 Preview. IGN. Retrieved on 2008-07-02. while some others opined she resembles Capcom's own Chun-Li. GamePro noted "she combines Chun Li's agility with Guy's ninjitsu."

In the manga Street Fighter: Sakura Ganbaru!, the author Masahiko Nakahira redesigned Maki's appearance for the manga, a look that would be reused in her later video game appearances. For later games, Maki's updated design resembles her appearance from the manga, as she is wearing red athletic shoes (similar to Guy's in the Street Fighter Alpha series) and wielding a tonfa (which was originally a pick-up weapon in Final Fight 2). Her hair is shown to be one complete color now, the leg guards removed, and the shirt part of her attire is now closed; some of her attacks tend to reveal she wears black underwear beneath her skirt. Maki has been slightly officially redesigned during the development of Street Fighter V, where the now-older Maki weighs 52  kg and 169  cm tall. She has a white hairpin and wields two tonfas instead of one. Her sister's name is entered as Nana.

 Gameplay 
Designed along the same lines as Guy, Maki is similar to him in the games, being the quick type of the three main characters in Final Fight 2 (in contrast to her co-protagonists Haggar and Carlos), who is not very strong but relies on very fast acrobatic techniques "and offers some awesome attack combinations." According to Super Play, Maki is "an exact replica of Guy from Final Fight, right down to the special feature of attacking off walls. She has a short-range, does medium damage, and is the fastest of the three by far. Plus she has an impressive rapid five-hit basic attack."

Maki is likewise an agile ninja with a variety of running attacks in Capcom vs. SNK 2.

Appearances
The plot of Final Fight 2 revolves around the kidnapping of Maki's father and her sister Rena by the newly revived Mad Gear gang. Maki enlists the help of Mike Haggar and his friend Carlos Miyamoto to rescue them. Makis first return appearance was tie-in manga in the Street Fighter Alpha 2 tie-in manga Sakura Ganbaru!, where she appears as one of Sakura Kasugano's competitors in a tournament sponsored by the Kanzuki family.

Maki has made her fighting game debut in Capcom vs. SNK 2: Mark of the Millennium 2001, and this incarnation of the character would be adapted for the portable versions of Street Fighter Alpha 3 for the Game Boy Advance and PlayStation Portable (PSP). Maki's ending in Capcom vs. SNK 2 implies that she is searching for Guy to challenge him for the Bushin style's succession following her father's death. Maki's storyline in the PSP version of Alpha 3 plays upon this premise and has Maki fighting Guy as her penultimate opponent in the single-player mode, before M. Bison; in a nod to her appearance in Sakura Ganbaru!, Maki also confronts Sakura as her fifth opponent.

Maki also appears in the SNK vs. Capcom: Card Fighters Clash video game series by SNK Playmore and in the Street Fighter comic series by UDON, and makes small cameos in the video games Final Fight Revenge (in Damnd's ending) and Capcom Fighting Evolution, and in the American Street Fighter cartoon series (in the episode "Final Fight"). A four-inch figurine of Maki was released only in Japan as part of a three-figure Capcom vs. SNK 2 set by Capcom, based on Kinu Nishimura's artwork for this game; Street Fighter Zero 3 figures of Maki were also released by other companies in 2002 and 2011.

Reception
Maki has been generally very well received by video game journalists and gamers alike. According to Hyper review of Final Fight 2, "Capcom get PC points for including a female character. Too often the girls are just the helpless kidnap victim, but Maki is as hard and fast as the blokes, and has some very damaging kicks in her repertoire."  Electronic Gaming Monthly ranked her first on their list of top ten fighting women in 1993. In the 2002 poll by Capcom, Maki was voted the 15th most popular Street Fighter character in Japan. In an official poll by Namco, Maki was the seventh most requested Street Fighter side character to be added to the roster of Tekken X Street Fighter. In a 2018 worldwide poll by Capcom, Maki was voted 24th most popular Street Fighter character (out of 109).

In 2011, Complex ranked her as the 11th best looking "sideline chick" of gaming, adding they have "made sure to put her front and center on our squad" in Capcom vs. SNK 2. In 2012, they ranked her "Hey! Don't worry about it! You know... being weak and all!" (Street Fighter Alpha 3 Max) as the 33rd most humiliating victory quote in fighting games. Discussing the "underused" characters of Street Fighter, Anime News Network's Todd Ciolek opined "Maki could've been huge if CAPCOM had stuck her in Super Street Fighter II instead of a Final Fight sequel." On the other hand, Maki's inclusion in Capcom Vs. SNK 2 has been criticized by Geraint Evans of NGC Magazine, who called her "utterly pointless compared to Capcom's other characters."FHM listed Maki as on the eight Capcom and Marvel "sexy characters" they would like to see in Ultimate Marvel vs. Capcom 3, because in Final Fight 2 "she beat up an entire army of muscle-bound 90s-style hoodlum freaks without even breaking a sweat." GamesRadar included her in their wishlist of the "reject" characters that should have been added to the roster of Street Fighter X Tekken. Heavy.com included her among top ten characters they wanted in Ultra Street Fighter IV, as she "would complement Guy and Ibuki's fighting styles quite well. All her wall bouncing, spin kicks and gauntlet beatdowns would make for a fine showing on a 2.5D plane." GamesRadar's Lucas Sullivan also requested her to return in Street Fighter V, stating that "Maki and Ibuki would get along like ninja peas in a pod." Evan Hopkins from Game Rant included Maki among the five characters he would like to return for Street Fighter V'', in which he would have her paired with Guy.

See also
Ninja in popular culture

References

Capcom protagonists
Characters designed by Akira Yasuda
Female characters in video games
Fictional female ninja
Fictional gang members
Fictional Japanese people in video games
Fictional stick-fighters
Ninja characters in video games
Final Fight characters
Street Fighter characters
Woman soldier and warrior characters in video games
Video game bosses
Video game characters introduced in 1993
Vigilante characters in video games